Darryl Worley is the third studio album by the American country music singer of the same name, released on November 2, 2004. Like his previous three albums, it was released on the DreamWorks Records Nashville label. The lead-off single, "Awful, Beautiful Life", became Worley's third and final Number One hit on the Hot Country Songs charts. "If Something Should Happen" made Top Ten on the same chart, while "I Love Her, She Hates Me" peaked at #59. After the latter single was released, DreamWorks was closed, and Worley exited for 903 music, a label started by Neal McCoy.

Track listing

Personnel
 Jim "Moose" Brown - Hammond organ, piano
 Melodie Crittenden - choir
 Eric Darken - percussion, vibraphone
 Matt Davich - clarinet
 Kevin "Swine" Grantt - bass guitar
 Aubrey Haynie - fiddle, mandolin
 Wes Hightower - choir, background vocals
 Steve Hinson - dobro, steel guitar
 Sharif Iman - choir
 Greg Morrow - drums, percussion, shaker
 Joe Murphy - tuba
 Kim Parent - choir
 Neal Rosengarden - trumpet
 Brent Rowan - baritone guitar, electric guitar
 Chris Stapleton - background vocals
 Bryan Sutton - banjo, acoustic guitar, hi-string guitar
 Darryl Worley - lead vocals
 Curtis Wright - background vocals

Chart performance

References

2004 albums
Darryl Worley albums
DreamWorks Records albums
Albums produced by Frank Rogers (record producer)